Frederick Strouts (1834 – 18 December 1919) was a notable New Zealand architect. He was born in Hothfield, Kent, England in 1834. He arrived in Lyttelton in 1859 and lived in Christchurch. Notable buildings include Ivey Hall at Lincoln University, the Canterbury Club building, the Lyttelton Harbour Board building, the Rhodes Convalescent Home in Cashmere, Strowan House (now part of St Andrew's College), and Otahuna homestead on Banks Peninsula. He was supervising architect at the Church of St Michael and All Angels in Christchurch. Strouts took on Cecil Wood in 1893 when Wood was 15 years of age.

References

1834 births
1919 deaths
English emigrants to New Zealand
People from Hothfield
19th-century New Zealand architects
People from Christchurch